Pinghe is a railway station on the Taiwan Railways Administration Taitung line located in Shoufeng Township, Hualien County, Taiwan.

History
The station was opened on 20 April 1934.

See also
 List of railway stations in Taiwan

References

1934 establishments in Taiwan
Railway stations in Hualien County
Railway stations opened in 1934
Railway stations served by Taiwan Railways Administration